Interstellar is a 2014 epic science fiction film co-written, directed, and produced by Christopher Nolan. It stars Matthew McConaughey, Anne Hathaway, Jessica Chastain, Bill Irwin, Ellen Burstyn, Matt Damon, and Michael Caine. Set in a dystopian future where humanity is struggling to survive, the film follows a group of astronauts who travel through a wormhole near Saturn in search of a new home for mankind.

Brothers Christopher and Jonathan Nolan wrote the screenplay, which had its origins in a script Jonathan developed in 2007. Caltech theoretical physicist and 2017 Nobel laureate in Physics Kip Thorne was an executive producer, acted as a scientific consultant, and wrote a tie-in book, The Science of Interstellar. Cinematographer Hoyte van Hoytema shot it on 35 mm movie film in the Panavision anamorphic format and IMAX 70 mm. Principal photography began in late 2013 and took place in Alberta, Iceland, and Los Angeles. Interstellar uses extensive practical and miniature effects and the company Double Negative created additional digital effects.

Interstellar premiered on October 26, 2014, in Los Angeles. In the United States, it was first released on film stock, expanding to venues using digital projectors. The film had a worldwide gross over $677 million (and $773 million with subsequent re-releases), making it the tenth-highest grossing film of 2014. It received acclaim for its performances, direction, screenplay, musical score, visual effects, ambition, themes, and emotional weight. It has also received praise from many astronomers for its scientific accuracy and portrayal of theoretical astrophysics. Since its premiere, Interstellar gained a cult following, and now is regarded by many sci-fi experts as one of the best science-fiction films of all time. Interstellar was nominated for five awards at the 87th Academy Awards, winning Best Visual Effects, and received numerous other accolades.

Plot

In 2067, a global famine caused humanity to abandon scientific pursuits such as space exploration. Ex-NASA pilot Joseph Cooper is forced to work as a farmer. One day, Cooper experiences a gravitational "anomaly" in his daughter Murph's bedroom. He deduces it to be a pattern of GPS coordinates and arrives at a secret NASA facility headed by Professor Brand. Brand explains to Cooper that it is engaged in a secret mission to discover an exoplanet capable of supporting life and that he is working on a gravity-equation. He enlists Cooper's help to pilot an exploratory spacecraft with three other scientists – Romilly, Doyle, and Brand’s daughter Amelia. The crew travels through a wormhole on board the Endurance to pass through to another galaxy. Their mission is to investigate three planets, orbiting a supermassive black hole called Gargantua, each of which was previously explored by a NASA scientist-explorer.  

The first planet is an aqua planet. The NASA explorer there is found dead, and one of their crew – Doyle – drowns after being caught in a massive tidal wave. The same tide also causes the probe's engines to be filled with water, forcing Cooper and Amelia to wait for them to dry out. They return to the Endurance in an hour, finding that 23 years have passed aboard due to the time dilation caused by the planet's proximity to Gargantua. In those 23 years, Murph has become a scientist, and begun working with Brand at NASA. She learns from a dying Professor Brand that he had given up on solving his gravity-equation, knowing that information is needed from inside a black hole. Instead, he put their mission's hopes on Cooper's team establishing a space colony using pre-fertilized eggs on a new habitable planet. 

At the second planet, the crew find its explorer, Mann, to be alive and awaken him from cryostasis. He eventually reveals to Cooper that he lied about the planet's habitability in the hope that NASA sent a mission to rescue him. Romilly dies in an explosion when he attempts to access the system's logs, while Mann tries to kill Cooper and hijack the Endurance spacecraft. Mann is killed when his craft fails to dock properly, and Cooper regains command of the Endurance. Cooper realizes that the Endurance only has enough resources for one person to safely complete their mission. He initiates a slingshot move around Gargantua, setting it to use gravity and be propelled to the final planet. At the last minute, he sacrifices himself by detaching from the spaceship and falling into the black hole, so that Amelia might safely complete the mission. 

Cooper survives and finds himself inside a five-dimensional tesseract, out of view from beyond the event horizon. From inside he can see moments in time from inside Murph's childhood bedroom. He finds her returning to look for clues to the gravity-equation, and he contacts her by manipulating items in the room with gravity to communicate through Morse code. Deducing that this construct has been created by future humans with the ability to time-travel, Cooper imparts to her the information she needs. With his mission completed, he is ejected by the future beings, who return him to the Solar System. He is reunited with a now elderly Murph, who he learns has used the gravity-equation to lead humanity's exodus from Earth. She advises him to seek out Amelia, and he sets off. Meanwhile, on the mission's final planet, Amelia is setting up a new colony for future humans to inhabit. She removes her helmet and breathes in the air, showing that the planet is capable of supporting human life.

Cast

 Matthew McConaughey as Joseph Cooper, a widowed NASA pilot who, after the agency was closed by the government, had become a farmer
 Anne Hathaway as Dr. Amelia Brand, a NASA scientist, and astronaut
 Jessica Chastain as Murphy "Murph" Cooper, Joseph's daughter, who eventually becomes a NASA scientist
 Mackenzie Foy as young Murph
 Ellen Burstyn as elderly Murph
 John Lithgow as Donald, Cooper's elderly father-in-law
 Michael Caine as Professor John Brand, a high-ranking NASA scientist, ideator of Plan A, former mentor of Cooper, and father of Amelia
 David Gyasi as Romilly, another high-ranking NASA member, and Endurance crew member
 Wes Bentley as Doyle, a high-ranking NASA member, and Endurance crew member
 Casey Affleck as Tom Cooper, Joseph's son, who eventually grows up to become a farmer
 Timothée Chalamet as young Tom
 Matt Damon as Mann, a NASA astronaut sent to an icy planet during the Lazarus program
 Bill Irwin as TARS  and CASE 
 Josh Stewart as CASE 
 Topher Grace as Getty, Murph's colleague and love interest
 Leah Cairns as Lois, Tom's wife
 David Oyelowo as School Principal
 Collette Wolfe as Ms. Hanley
 William Devane as Williams, another NASA member
 Elyes Gabel as Administrator
 Jeff Hephner as Doctor
 Russ Fega as Crew Chief

Production

Crew

 Christopher Nolan – Director, producer, writer
 Jonathan Nolan – Writer
 Emma Thomas – Producer
 Lynda Obst – Producer
 Hoyte van Hoytema – Cinematographer
 Nathan Crowley – Production designer
 Mary Zophres – Costume designer
 Lee Smith – Editor
 Hans Zimmer – Music composer
 Paul Franklin – Visual effects supervisor
 Kip Thorne – Consultant, executive producer

Development and financing
The premise for Interstellar was conceived by producer Lynda Obst and theoretical physicist Kip Thorne, who collaborated on the film Contact (1997), and had known each other since Carl Sagan set them up on a blind date. The two conceived a scenario, based on Thorne's work, about "the most exotic events in the universe suddenly becoming accessible to humans," and attracted filmmaker Steven Spielberg's interest in directing. The film began development in June 2006, when Spielberg and Paramount Pictures announced plans for a science-fiction film based on an eight-page treatment written by Obst and Thorne. Obst was attached to produce. By March 2007, Jonathan Nolan was hired to write a screenplay.

After Spielberg moved his production studio DreamWorks from Paramount to Walt Disney Studios in 2009, Paramount needed a new director for Interstellar. Jonathan Nolan recommended his brother Christopher, who joined the project in 2012. Christopher Nolan met with Thorne, then attached as executive producer, to discuss the use of spacetime in the story. In January 2013, Paramount and Warner Bros. announced that Christopher Nolan was in negotiations to direct Interstellar. Nolan said he wanted to encourage the goal of human spaceflight, and intended to merge his brother's screenplay with his own. By the following March, Nolan was confirmed to direct Interstellar, which would be produced under his label Syncopy and Lynda Obst Productions. The Hollywood Reporter said Nolan would earn a salary of  against 20% of the total gross. To research for the film, Nolan visited NASA and the private space program at SpaceX.

Warner Bros. sought a stake in Nolan's production of Interstellar from Paramount, despite their traditional rivalry, and agreed to give Paramount its rights to co-finance the next film in the Friday the 13th horror franchise, with a stake in a future film based on the television series South Park. Warner Bros. also agreed to let Paramount co-finance an indeterminate "A-list" property. In August 2013, Legendary Pictures finalized an agreement with Warner Bros. to finance approximately 25% of the film's production. Although it failed to renew its eight-year production partnership with Warner Bros., Legendary reportedly agreed to forgo financing Batman v Superman: Dawn of Justice (2016) in exchange for the stake in Interstellar.

Writing and casting

Screenwriter Jonathan Nolan worked on the script for four years. To learn the scientific aspects, he studied relativity at the California Institute of Technology. Jonathan was pessimistic about the Space Shuttle program ending and how NASA lacked financing for a human mission to Mars, drawing inspiration from science-fiction films with apocalyptic themes, such as WALL-E (2008) and Avatar (2009). Jeff Jensen of Entertainment Weekly commented: "He set the story in a dystopian future ravaged by blight, but populated with hardy folk who refuse to bow to despair." His brother Christopher had worked on other science fiction scripts but decided to take the Interstellar script and choose among the vast array of ideas presented by Jonathan and Thorne, picking what he felt, as director, he could get "across to the audience and hopefully not lose them," before he merged it with a script he had worked on for years on his own. Christopher kept in place Jonathan's conception of the first hour, which is set on a resource depleted Earth in the near future. The setting was inspired by the Dust Bowl that took place in the United States during the Great Depression in the 1930s. He revised the rest of the script, where a team travels into space, instead. After watching the 2012 documentary The Dust Bowl for inspiration, Christopher contacted director Ken Burns and producer Dayton Duncan, requesting permission to use some of their featured interviews in Interstellar, which was granted.

Christopher Nolan wanted an actor who could bring to life his vision of the main character as an everyman with whom "the audience could experience the story." He became interested in casting Matthew McConaughey after watching him in an early cut of the 2012 film Mud, which he had seen as a friend of one of its producers, Aaron Ryder. Nolan went to visit McConaughey while he was filming for the TV series True Detective. Anne Hathaway was invited to Nolan's home, where she read the script for Interstellar. In early 2013, both actors were cast in the starring roles. Jessica Chastain was contacted while she was working on Miss Julie (2014) in Northern Ireland, and a script was delivered to her. Originally, Irrfan Khan was offered the role of Dr. Mann but rejected due to scheduling conflicts. Matt Damon was cast as Mann in late August 2013 and completed filming his scenes in Iceland.

Principal photography
Nolan shot Interstellar on 35 mm film in the Panavision anamorphic format and IMAX 70 mm photography. Cinematographer Hoyte van Hoytema was hired for Interstellar, as Wally Pfister, Nolan's cinematographer on all of his previous films, was making his directorial debut working on Transcendence (2014). More IMAX cameras were used for Interstellar than for any of Nolan's previous films. To minimize the use of computer-generated imagery (CGI), the director had practical locations built, such as the interior of a space shuttle. Van Hoytema retooled an IMAX camera to be hand-held for shooting interior scenes. Some of the film's sequences were shot with an IMAX camera installed in the nose cone of a Learjet.

Nolan, who is known for keeping details of his productions secret, strove to ensure secrecy for Interstellar. Writing for The Wall Street Journal, Ben Fritz stated, "The famously secretive filmmaker has gone to extreme lengths to guard the script to ... Interstellar, just as he did with the blockbuster Dark Knight trilogy." As one security measure, Interstellar was filmed under the name Flora's Letter, Flora being one of Nolan's four children with producer Emma Thomas.

The film's principal photography was scheduled to last four months. Towns in Alberta where shooting took place included Nanton, Longview, Lethbridge, Fort Macleod, and Okotoks. In Okotoks, filming took place at the Seaman Stadium and the Olde Town Plaza. For a cornfield scene, production designer Nathan Crowley planted  of corn that would be destroyed in an apocalyptic dust storm scene, intended to be similar to storms experienced during the Dust Bowl in 1930s America. Additional scenes involving the dust storm and McConaughey's character were also shot in Fort Macleod, where the giant dust clouds were created on location using large fans to blow cellulose-based synthetic dust through the air. Filming in the province lasted until , 2013, and involved hundreds of extras in addition to  members, most of whom were local.

Shooting also took place in Iceland, where Nolan had previously filmed scenes for Batman Begins (2005). The location was chosen to represent two extraterrestrial planets: one covered in ice, and the other in water. Locations included the Svínafellsjökull glacier and the town of Klaustur. While filming a water scene in Iceland, Hathaway almost suffered hypothermia because the dry suit she was wearing had not been properly secured.

Filming locations included the Westin Bonaventure Hotel and Suites, the Los Angeles Convention Center, a Sony Pictures soundstage in Culver City, and a private residence in Altadena, California. Principal photography concluded in December 2013.

Production design

Interstellar features three spacecraft— a ranger, the Endurance, and a lander. The ranger's function is similar to the Space Shuttle's, being able to enter and exit planetary atmospheres. The Endurance, the crew's mother ship, is a circular structure consisting of 12 capsules, laid flat to mimic a clock: Four capsules with planetary settling equipment, four with engines, and four with the permanent functions of cockpit, medical labs, and habitation. Production designer Nathan Crowley said the Endurance was based on the International Space Station: "It's a real mish-mash of different kinds of technology. You need analogue stuff, as well as digital stuff, you need backup systems and tangible switches. It's really like a submarine in space. Every inch of space is used, everything has a purpose." Lastly, the lander transports the capsules with settling equipment to planetary surfaces. Crowley compared it to "a heavy Russian helicopter."

The film also features two robots, CASE and TARS, as well as a dismantled third robot, KIPP. Nolan wanted to avoid making the robots anthropomorphic and chose a  quadrilateral design. The director said: "It has a very complicated design philosophy. It's based on mathematics. You've got four main blocks and they can be joined in three ways. So, you have three combinations you follow. But then within that, it subdivides into a further three joints. And all the places we see lines—those can subdivide further. So you can unfold a finger, essentially, but it's all proportional." Actor Bill Irwin voiced and physically controlled both robots, but his image was digitally removed from the film, and actor Josh Stewart's voice replaced his voicing for CASE. The human space habitats resemble O'Neill cylinders, a theoretical space habitat model proposed by physicist Gerard K. O'Neill in 1976.

Sound design and music

Gregg Landaker and Gary Rizzo were the film's audio engineers tasked with audio mixing, while sound editor Richard King supervised the process. Christopher Nolan sought to mix the sound to take maximum advantage of theater equipment and paid close attention to designing the sound mix, like focusing on the sound of buttons being pressed with astronaut suit gloves. The studio's website stated that the film was "mixed to maximize the power of the low-end frequencies in the main channels, as well as in the subwoofer channel." Nolan deliberately intended some dialogue to seem drowned out by ambient noise or music, causing some theaters to post notices emphasizing that this effect was intentional and not a fault in their equipment.

Composer Hans Zimmer, who scored Nolan's The Dark Knight Trilogy and Inception (2010), returned to score Interstellar. Nolan chose not to provide Zimmer with a script or any plot details for writing the film's music but instead gave the composer a single page that told the story of a father leaving his child for work. It was through this connection that Zimmer created the early stages of the Interstellar soundtrack. Zimmer and Nolan later decided that the 1926 four-manual Harrison & Harrison organ of the Temple Church, London, would be the primary instrument for the score. Zimmer conducted 45 scoring sessions for Interstellar, three times more than for Inception. The soundtrack was released on November 18, 2014.

Visual effects
Visual effects company Double Negative, which worked on Inception, was brought back for Interstellar. According to visual effects supervisor Paul Franklin, the number of effects in the film was not much greater than in Nolan's The Dark Knight Rises (2012) or Inception. However, for Interstellar, they created the effects first, allowing digital projectors to display them behind the actors, rather than having the actors perform in front of green screens. Ultimately, the film contained 850 visual-effect shots at a resolution of 5600 × 4000 lines: 150 shots that were created in-camera using digital projectors, and another 700 were created in post-production. Of those, 620 were presented in IMAX, while the rest were anamorphic.

The models were then attached to a six-axis gimbal on a motion control system that allowed an operator to manipulate their movements, which were filmed against background plates of space using VistaVision cameras on a smaller motion control rig. New Deal Studio's miniatures were used in 150 special effects shots.

Influences
The director was influenced by what he called "key touchstones" of science fiction cinema, including Metropolis (1927), 2001: A Space Odyssey (1968), Blade Runner (1982), Star Wars (1977), and Alien (1979). Andrei Tarkovsky's The Mirror (1975) influenced "elemental things in the story to do with wind and dust and water", according to Nolan, who also compared Interstellar to The Treasure of the Sierra Madre (1948) as a film about human nature. He sought to emulate films like Steven Spielberg's Jaws (1975) and Close Encounters of the Third Kind (1977) for being family-friendly but also "as edgy and incisive and challenging as anything else on the blockbuster spectrum". He screened The Right Stuff (1983) for the crew before production, following in its example by capturing reflections on the Interstellar astronauts' visors. For further inspiration, the director invited former astronaut Marsha Ivins to the set. Nolan and his crew studied the IMAX NASA documentaries of filmmaker Toni Myers for visual reference of spacefaring missions, and strove to imitate their use of IMAX cameras in the enclosed spaces of spacecraft interiors. Clark Kent's upbringing in Man of Steel (2013) was the inspiration for the farm setting in the Midwest. Apart from films, Nolan drew inspiration from the architecture of Ludwig Mies van der Rohe.

Scientific accuracy

Regarding the concepts of wormholes and black holes, Kip Thorne stated that he "worked on the equations that would enable tracing of light rays as they traveled through a wormhole or around a black hole—so what you see is based on Einstein's general relativity equations." Early in the process, Thorne laid down two guidelines: "First, that nothing would violate established physical laws. Second, that all the wild speculations ... would spring from science and not from the fertile mind of a screenwriter." Nolan accepted these terms as long as they did not get in the way of making the film. At one point, Thorne spent two weeks trying to talk Nolan out of an idea about a character traveling faster than light before Nolan finally gave up. According to Thorne, the element which has the highest degree of artistic freedom is the clouds of ice on one of the planets they visit, which are structures that would go beyond the material strength that ice could support.

Astrobiologist David Grinspoon criticized the dire "blight" situation on Earth portrayed in the early scenes, pointing out that even with a voracious blight it would have taken millions of years to reduce the atmosphere's oxygen content. He also notes that gravity should have pulled down the ice clouds. Neil deGrasse Tyson, an astrophysicist, explored the science behind the ending of Interstellar, concluding that it is theoretically possible to interact with the past, and that "we don't really know what's in a black hole, so take it and run with it." Theoretical physicist Michio Kaku praised the film for its scientific accuracy and has said Interstellar "could set the gold standard for science fiction movies for years to come." Similarly, Timothy Reyes, a former NASA software engineer, said "Thorne's and Nolan's accounting of black holes and wormholes and the use of gravity is excellent."

Wormholes and black holes

To create the visual effects for the wormhole and a rotating, supermassive black hole (possessing an ergosphere, as opposed to a non-rotating black hole), Thorne collaborated with Franklin and a team of 30 people at Double Negative, providing pages of deeply sourced theoretical equations to the engineers, who then wrote new CGI rendering software based on these equations to create accurate simulations of the gravitational lensing caused by these phenomena. Some individual frames took up to 100 hours to render, totaling 800 terabytes of data. Thorne described the accretion disk of the black hole as "anemic and at low temperature—about the temperature of the surface of the sun," allowing it to emit appreciable light, but not enough gamma radiation and X-rays to threaten nearby astronauts and planets. The resulting visual effects provided Thorne with new insight into the gravitational lensing and accretion disks surrounding black holes, resulting in the publication of three scientific papers.

Christopher Nolan was initially concerned that a scientifically accurate depiction of a black hole would not be visually comprehensible to an audience, and would require the effects team to unrealistically alter its appearance. The visual representation of the black hole in the film does not account for the Doppler effect which, when added by the visual effects team, resulted in an asymmetrically lit black and blue-black hole, the purpose of which Nolan thought the audience would not understand. As a result, it was omitted in the finished product. Nolan found the finished effect to be understandable, as long as he maintained consistent camera perspectives.

As a reference, the asymmetric brightness of the accretion disk is very well visible in the first image of the event horizon of a black hole obtained by the Event Horizon Telescope team in 2019. Futura-Sciences praised the correct depiction of the Penrose process.

According to Space.com, the portrayal of what a wormhole would look like is considered scientifically correct. Rather than a two-dimensional hole in space, it is depicted as a sphere, showing a distorted view of the target galaxy.

Marketing
The teaser trailer for Interstellar debuted , 2013, and featured clips related to space exploration, accompanied by a voiceover by Matthew McConaughey's character, Cooper. The theatrical trailer debuted , 2014, at the Lockheed Martin IMAX Theater in Washington, D.C. and was made available online later that month.

Christopher Nolan and McConaughey made their first appearances at San Diego Comic-Con in July 2014 to promote Interstellar. That same month, Paramount Pictures launched an interactive website, on which users uncovered a star chart related to the Apollo 11 Moon landing.

In October 2014, Paramount partnered with Google to promote Interstellar across multiple platforms. The film's website was relaunched as a digital hub hosted on a Google domain, which collected feedback from film audiences, and linked to a mobile app. It featured a game in which players could build Solar System models and use a flight simulator for space travel. The Paramount–Google partnership also included a virtual time capsule compiled with user-generated content, made available in 2015. The initiative Google for Education used the film as a basis for promoting math and science lesson plans in schools.

Paramount provided a virtual reality walkthrough of the Endurance spacecraft using Oculus Rift technology. It hosted the walkthrough sequentially in New York City, Houston, Los Angeles, and Washington, D.C., from  through , 2014. W. W. Norton & Company released The Science of Interstellar, a book by Thorne; Titan Books released the official novelization, written by Greg Keyes; and Wired magazine released a tie-in online comic, Absolute Zero, written by Christopher Nolan and drawn by Sean Gordon Murphy. The comic is a prequel to the film, with Mann as the protagonist.

Release

Theatrical
The film premiered on November 7 in Canada.

For the limited North American release, Interstellar was projected from 70 mm and 35 mm film in  that still supported those formats, including at least  theaters. A  IMAX projector was installed at the TCL Chinese Theatre in Los Angeles to display the format. The film's wide release expanded to theaters that showed it digitally. Paramount Pictures distributed the film in North America, and Warner Bros. distributed it in the remaining territories. The film was released in over 770 IMAX screens worldwide, which was the largest global release in IMAX cinemas, until surpassed by Universal Pictures' Furious 7 (2015) with 810 IMAX theaters.

Interstellar was an exception to Paramount Pictures' goal to stop releasing films on film stock and to distribute them only in digital format. According to Pamela McClintock of The Hollywood Reporter, the initiative to project Interstellar on film stock would help preserve an endangered format, which was supported by Christopher Nolan, J. J. Abrams, Quentin Tarantino, Judd Apatow, Paul Thomas Anderson, and other filmmakers. McClintock reported that theatre owners saw this as "backward," as nearly all theatres in the US had been converted to digital projection.

Home media
Interstellar was released on home video on March 31, 2015, in both the United Kingdom and United States. It topped the home video sales chart for a total of two weeks. It was reported that Interstellar was the most pirated film of 2015, with an estimated 46.7 million downloads on BitTorrent. It was released in the Ultra HD Blu-ray format on December 19, 2017.

Reception

Box office
Interstellar grossed $188 million in the US and Canada, and $489.4 million in other countries, for a worldwide total of $677.4 million against a production budget of $165 million. Deadline Hollywood calculated the net profit of the film to be $47.2 million, accounting for production budgets, marketing, talent participations, and other costs, with box office grosses, and ancillary revenues from home media, placing it twentieth on their list of 2014's "Most Valuable Blockbusters". It sold an estimated 22 million tickets domestically.

The film set an IMAX opening record worldwide with $20.5 million from 574 IMAX theaters, surpassing the $17.1 million record held by The Hunger Games: Catching Fire (2013), and is also the best opening for an IMAX 2D, non-sequel, and November IMAX release. It had a worldwide opening of $132.6 million, which was the tenth-largest opening of 2014, and it became the tenth-highest-grossing film of 2014. Interstellar is the fourth film to gross over $100 million worldwide from IMAX ticket sales. Interstellar was released in the UK, Ireland and Malta on November 6, 2014, and debuted at number one earning £5.37 million ($8.6 million) in its opening weekend, which was lower than the openings of The Dark Knight Rises (£14.36 million), Gravity (£6.24 million), and Inception (£5.91 million). The film was released in 35 markets on the same day, including major markets like Germany, Russia, Australia, and Brazil earning $8.7 million in total. Through Sunday, it earned an opening weekend total of $82.9 million from 11.1 million admissions from over 14,800 screens in 62 markets. It earned $7.3 million from 206 IMAX screens, at an average of 35,400 viewers per theater. It went to number one in South Korea ($14.4 million), Russia ($8.9 million), and France ($5.3 million). Other strong openings occurred in Germany ($4.6 million), India ($4.3 million), Italy ($3.7 million), Australia ($3.7 million), Spain ($2.7 million), Mexico ($3.1 million), and Brazil ($1.9 million). Interstellar was released in China on November 12 and earned $5.4 million on its opening day on Wednesday, which is Nolan's biggest opening in China after surpassing the $4.61 million opening record of The Dark Knight Rises. It went on to earn $41.7 million in its opening weekend, accounting for 55% of the market share. It is Nolan's biggest opening in China, Warner Bros.' biggest 2D opening, and the studio's third-biggest opening of all time, behind 2014's The Hobbit: The Battle of the Five Armies ($49.5 million) and 2013's Pacific Rim ($45.2 million).

It topped the box office outside North America for two consecutive weekends before being overtaken by The Hunger Games: Mockingjay – Part 1 (2014) in its third weekend. Just 31 days after its release, the film became the 13th-most-successful film and 3rd-most-successful foreign film in South Korea with 9.1 million admissions trailing only Avatar (13.3 million admissions), and 2013's Frozen (10.3 million admissions). The film closed down its theatrical run in China on December 12, with total revenue of $122.6 million. In total earnings, its largest markets outside North America and China were South Korea ($73.4 million), the UK, Ireland and Malta ($31.3 million), and Russia and the Commonwealth of Independent States (CIS) ($19 million). Interstellar and Big Hero 6 opened the same weekend (2014) in the US and Canada. In North America, the film is the seventh-highest-grossing film to not hit No. 1, with a top rank of No. 2 on its opening weekend. Interstellar had an early limited release in the US and Canada in selected theaters on November 4 at 8:00 pm, coinciding with the 2014 US midterm elections. It topped the box office the following day, earning $1.35 million from 249 theaters (42 of which were IMAX screens); IMAX accounted for 62% of its total gross. Two hundred and forty of those theaters played in 35 mm, 70 mm, and IMAX 70 mm film formats. It earned $3.6 million from late-night shows for a previews total of $4.9 million. The film was widely released on November 7 and topped the box office on its opening day, earning $17 million ahead of Big Hero 6 ($15.8 million). On its opening weekend, the film earned $47.5 million from 3,561 theaters, debuting in second place after a neck-and-neck competition with Disney's Big Hero 6 ($56.2 million). IMAX comprised $13.2 million (28%) of its opening weekend gross, while other premium large-format screens comprised $5.3 million (10.5%) of the gross. In its second weekend, the film fell to No. 3 behind old rival Big Hero 6 and newcomer Dumb and Dumber To (2014), and dropped 39% earning $29.1 million for a two-weekend total of $97.8 million. It earned $7.4 million from IMAX theaters from 368 screens in its second weekend. In its third week, the film earned $15.1 million and remained at No. 3, below newcomer The Hunger Games: Mockingjay – Part 1 and Big Hero 6.

Critical response
On review aggregator Rotten Tomatoes, 72% of 373 critic reviews are positive, with an average rating of 7.10/10. The website's critics consensus reads, "Interstellar represents more of the thrilling, thought-provoking, and visually resplendent filmmaking moviegoers have come to expect from writer-director Christopher Nolan, even if its intellectual reach somewhat exceeds its grasp." Metacritic, which uses a weighted average, assigned the film a score of 74 out of 100 based on 46 critics, indicating "generally favorable reviews". Audiences polled by CinemaScore gave the film an average grade of "B+" on an A+ to F scale.

Scott Foundas, chief film critic at Variety, said that Interstellar is "as visually and conceptually audacious as anything Nolan has yet done" and considered the film "more personal" than Nolan's previous films. Claudia Puig of USA Today praised the visual spectacle and powerful themes, while criticizing the "dull" dialogue and "tedious patches inside the space vessel." David Stratton of At the Movies rated the film four-and-a-half stars out of five, commending its ambition, effects, and 70 mm IMAX presentation, though criticizing the sound for "being so loud" as to make some of the dialogue "inaudible". Conversely, co-host Margaret Pomeranz rated the film three out of five, as she felt the human drama got lost among the film's scientific concepts. Henry Barnes of The Guardian scored the film three out of five stars, calling it "a glorious spectacle, but a slight drama, with few characters and too-rare flashes of humour." James Berardinelli called Interstellar "an amazing achievement" and "simultaneously a big-budget science fiction endeavor and a very simple tale of love and sacrifice. It is by turns edgy, breathtaking, hopeful, and heartbreaking." He named it the best film of 2014, and the second-best movie of the decade, deeming it a "real science fiction rather than the crowd-pleasing, watered-down version Hollywood typically offers".

Oliver Gettell of the Los Angeles Times reported that "film critics largely agree that Interstellar is an entertaining, emotional, and thought-provoking sci-fi saga, even if it can also be clunky and sentimental at times." James Dyer of Empire awarded the film a full five stars, describing it as "brainy, barmy, and beautiful to behold ... a mind-bending opera of space and time with a soul wrapped up in all the science." Dave Calhoun of Time Out London also granted the film a maximum score of five stars, stating that it is "a bold, beautiful cosmic adventure story with a touch of the surreal and the dreamlike." Richard Roeper of Chicago Sun-Times awarded the film a full four stars and wrote, "This is one of the most beautiful films I have ever seen—in terms of its visuals, and its overriding message about the powerful forces of the one thing we all know but can't measure in scientific terms. Love."

Describing Nolan as a "merchant of awe," Tim Robey of The Telegraph thought that Interstellar was "agonisingly" close to a masterpiece, highlighting the conceptual boldness and "deep-digging intelligence" of the film. Todd McCarthy of The Hollywood Reporter wrote, "This grandly conceived and executed epic tries to give equal weight to intimate human emotions and speculation about the cosmos, with mixed results, but is never less than engrossing, and sometimes more than that." In his review for the Associated Press, Jake Coyle praised the film for its "big-screen grandeur," while finding some of the dialogue "clunky." He described it further as "an absurd endeavor" and "one of the most sublime movies of the decade." Scott Mendelson of Forbes listed Interstellar as one of the most disappointing films of 2014, stating that the film "has a lack of flow, loss of momentum following the climax, clumsy sound mixing," and "thin characters" despite seeing the film twice in order to "give it a second chance." He wrote that Interstellar "ends up as a stripped-down and somewhat muted variation on any number of 'go into space to save the world' movies." Matt Zoller Seitz of RogerEbert.com gave the film three-and-a-half out of four stars, saying that despite his usual quibbles regarding Nolan's excessive dialogue and its lack of a sense of composition, "[Interstellar] is still an impressive, at times astonishing movie that overwhelmed me to the point where my usual objections to Nolan's work melted away ... At times, the movie's one-stop-shopping storytelling evokes the tough-tender spirit of a John Ford picture ... a movie that would rather try to be eight or nine things than just one."

New York Times columnist David Brooks concludes that Interstellar explores the relationships among "science and faith and science and the humanities" and "illustrates the real symbiosis between these realms." Wai Chee Dimock, in the Los Angeles Review of Books, wrote that Nolan's films are "rotatable at 90, 180, and 360 degrees," and that "although there is considerable magical thinking here, making it almost an anti-sci-fi film, holding out hope that the end of the planet is not the end of everything, it reverses itself, however, when that magic falls short when the poetic license is naked and plain for all to see." Author George R. R. Martin called Interstellar "the most ambitious and challenging science fiction film since Kubrick's 2001." In 2020, Empire magazine ranked it as one of the best films of the 21st century.

Accolades

At the 87th Academy Awards, Interstellar received nominations for Best Original Score, Best Production Design, Best Sound Editing, and Best Sound Mixing, and 
won Best Visual Effects.

See also

 Black holes in fiction
 Blanet – planet orbiting a black hole
 Causal loop
 Interstellar travel
 List of American films of 2014
 List of British films of 2014
 List of films featuring drones
 List of films featuring space stations
 List of time travel works of fiction
 Starship
 Wormholes in fiction

Notes

References

Further reading
 
 
 
 MacKay, John. "On Interstellar (2014) (preliminary notes)"

External links

 
 
 
 

2010s disaster films
2010s science fiction drama films
American disaster films
American science fiction drama films
American epic films
American robot films
American space adventure films
American survival films
Apocalyptic films
BAFTA winners (films)
Black holes in film
British disaster films
British epic films
American dystopian films
Environmental films
Existentialist films
Generation ships in fiction
Films scored by Hans Zimmer
Films about time
Films about NASA
Films about astronauts
Films about farmers
Films about physics
Films about scientists
Films about weather hazards
Films about widowhood
Films directed by Christopher Nolan
Films produced by Christopher Nolan
Films produced by Lynda Obst
Films produced by Emma Thomas
Films set in the future
Films shot in Alberta
Films shot in Iceland
Films shot in Los Angeles
Films set in Colorado
Films set on farms
Films set on spacecraft
Films set on fictional planets
Films that won the Best Visual Effects Academy Award
Fiction about galaxies
Hard science fiction films
Ice planets in fiction
IMAX films
Legendary Pictures films
Fiction set on ocean planets
Saturn in film
Films with screenplays by Christopher Nolan
Films with screenplays by Jonathan Nolan
Syncopy Inc. films
Films about time travel
Films about wormholes
Fiction about intergalactic travel
Warner Bros. films
Paramount Pictures films
2014 drama films
Films set in 2067
Films set in outer space
Films about father–daughter relationships
2010s English-language films
2010s American films
2010s British films